Stigmatochroma is a genus of lichenized fungi in the family Caliciaceae. The genus has a widespread distribution, and contains 9 species.

Species
Stigmatochroma adauctum  (2000)
Stigmatochroma epiflavium  (2000)
Stigmatochroma epimartum  (2000)
Stigmatochroma kryptoviolascens  (2000)
Stigmatochroma maccarthyi  (2016)
Stigmatochroma metaleptodes  (2000)
Stigmatochroma microsporum  (2015)
Stigmatochroma sorediatum  (2000)

References

Caliciales
Caliciales genera
Lichen genera
Taxa described in 2000